Kukučínov is a village and municipality in the Levice District in the Nitra Region of Slovakia.

History
In historical records the village was first mentioned in 1293.

Geography
The village lies at an altitude of 138 metres and covers an area of 11.309 km². It has a population of about 600 people.

Ethnicity
The village is approximately 65% Slovak, 33% Magyar, and 1% Czech, 1% Gypsy

Facilities
The village has a public library and football pitch.

External links
https://web.archive.org/web/20080111223415/http://www.statistics.sk/mosmis/eng/run.html

Villages and municipalities in Levice District